Terry Wright is the name of:

 Terry Wright (defensive back) (born 1964), American player of gridiron football
 Terry Wright (rugby union) (born 1963), New Zealand rugby union player
 Terry Wright (wide receiver) (born 1997), American football wide receiver
 T. M. Wright (1947–2015), writer of horror fiction, speculative fiction, and poetry